Michael Gibson may refer to:
Michael Gibson (Australian footballer) (born 1965), former Australian rules footballer 
Michael Gibson (British Army soldier) (1906–1941), bomb disposal expert
Michael Gibson (musician) (1944–2005), musician and orchestrator
Michael Gibson (TV presenter) (born 1980), TV presenter and documentary director
Michael Gibson (soccer) (born 1963), Australian international footballer
Mike Gibson (American football) (born 1985), American football guard for the Philadelphia Eagles
Mike Gibson (footballer) (born 1939), English former association football player
Mike Gibson (rugby union) (born 1942), Irish former rugby union footballer
Mike Gibson (basketball), American basketball player
Mike Gibson (sports journalist), Australian sports journalist
Michael Francis Gibson (1929–2017), art critic, art historian, and writer